Macrocephalites is a genus of the stephanoceratoid ammonite family Macrocephalitidae, diagnostic of the Callovian stage of the Middle Jurassic.  Three subgenera,  Dolikephalites,  Kamptokephalites, and Pleurocephalites are recognized in addition to Macrocephalites itself, with Indocephalites tentatively included as the fourth.

Diagnosis Macrocephalites s.s.
Macrocephalites itself has a strongly ribbed, involute, subglobose to discoidal shell with a somewhat small open umbilicus, compressed whorl section, higher than wide, and rounded venter. Early whorls are more strongly ribbed than later, which become smoother, ending with a smooth body chamber.  Primary ribs, which emanate radially from the umbilicus, bifurcate and sometimes trifurcate mid flank and cross the venter uninterrupted.  Shells grew to be large, even gigantic.  Distribution is widespread.

Subgenera
Dolikephalites is similar in general form to Macrocephalites but has fine ribbing that continues to the end and is never large.

Kamptokephalites is more globose than Macrocephalites proper, with a depressed whorl section, wider than high, broadly arched venter, coarse plicate ribbing and wider umbilicus.Pleurocephalites also has a broad shell with depressed whorl section and sharp ribbing that continues to the end. Primary ribs on the inner part of the whorls slope dorso-ventrally to the rear.Indocephalites''''' is broad and coarsely ribbed in early growth stages but becomes smoother and more compressed in the adult.

Gallery

References

 Arkell et al. 1957. Mesozoic Ammonoidea. Treatise on Invertebrate Paleontology, Part L.  Geological Society of America and Univ of Kansas Press,  R.C. Moore (ed)
 Macrocephalites verus Buckman 1922, illustrated.
 Macrocephalites (Kamptokephalites) aff. cossmani Petitclerc 1915, illustrated.

Jurassic ammonites
Ammonites of Europe
Stephanoceratoidea
Ammonitida genera